Major General Henry Pinckney McCain (January 23, 1861 – July 25, 1941) was an officer in the United States Army who served as Adjutant General of the Army from 1914 to 1918.

Early life 
McCain was born in Carroll County, Mississippi, on January 23, 1861, the son of Mr. and Mrs. W. A. McCain. He entered and later graduated from the United States Military Academy (USMA) at West Point, New York, in June 1885. Among his classmates included several officers who would become future general officers, such as Beaumont B. Buck, Joseph E. Kuhn, Robert Lee Bullard, Robert Michie, George W. Burr, John D. Barrette, John M. Carson Jr., Robert A. Brown, Charles H. Muir, William F. Martin, Daniel B. Devore and Willard A. Holbrook. Upon graduating, he was commissioned a second lieutenant in the 3rd U.S. Infantry Regiment (The Old Guard) at Fort Shaw, Montana.

Military career 
From March 1889 to August 1891, he was Professor of Military Science and Tactics at Louisiana State University. He was promoted to first lieutenant in the 21st Infantry in February 1892, and transferred to the 14th Infantry in March, serving in the Department of the Columbia.

He was stationed in Alaska when the Spanish–American War broke out in April 1898. McCain sailed with his regiment to the Philippines in May, and was present for the Battle of Manila. He served as the acting assistant adjutant general for U.S. forces in the Philippines, but had to return to the United States in September due to illness. He held various staff positions in the Department of the Columbia and was promoted to captain in March 1899.

In November 1900, McCain was promoted to major and transferred to the Adjutant General's Office in Washington, D.C. He was promoted again to lieutenant colonel in January 1901. In August 1903, he was assigned as chief of staff for the Department of Mindanao in the Philippines. In March 1904 he returned to the United States as chief of staff for the Southwestern Division. And in April 1904 he was promoted to colonel and returned to the Adjutant General's Office in Washington, where he served until the autumn of 1912.

Following a stint as adjutant general of the Philippines Division from 1912 to 1914, McCain was promoted to brigadier general and elevated to Adjutant General of the United States Army. In October 1917, six months after the American entry into World War I, he was promoted to major general. In August 1918 he was given command of the 12th Division at Camp Devens, Massachusetts, ultimately intended for service on the Western Front. However, the Armistice with Germany on November 11, 1918 brought an end to hostilities and, as a result, McCain's division was demobilized in January 1919 without having gone overseas. McCain continued to command Camp Devens to July 1920.

In June 1920, McCain reverted to his permanent peacetime rank of colonel and served as adjutant of the Sixth Corps Area until his retirement in July 1921. He served as governor of the United States Soldiers' Home in Washington, D.C. from May 1927 to April 1936. He died in Washington on July 25, 1941, shortly before the United States was to enter World War II, and is buried in Arlington National Cemetery.

Awards and honors
He received the Army Distinguished Service Medal for his services in administering the Adjutant General's Department during World War I. The citation for the medal reads:

He also received the following service medal during his long military career:
Spanish Campaign Medal
Philippine Campaign Medal
World War I Victory Medal

Legacy
Camp McCain, an Army mobilization site near Grenada, Mississippi, was established in 1942 and named for General McCain.  It was later used as a Mississippi Army National Guard training facility.

Personal life 
He married Emiline DeMoss on November 14, 1888.

See also
 List of Adjutants General of the U.S. Army
 List of major generals in the United States Regular Army before July 1, 1920
 McCain family heritage

References

Bibliography

|-

1861 births
1941 deaths
Adjutants general of the United States Army
American military personnel of the Spanish–American War
Burials at Arlington National Cemetery
McCain family
United States Army generals
People from Carroll County, Mississippi
Recipients of the Distinguished Service Medal (US Army)
United States Army generals of World War I
United States Military Academy alumni
Military personnel from Mississippi
Louisiana State University faculty